The list below describes such skeletal movements as normally are possible in particular joints of the human body. Other animals have different degrees of movement at their respective joints; this is because of differences in positions of muscles and because structures peculiar to the bodies of humans and other species block motions unsuited to their anatomies.

Arm and shoulder

Shoulder
elbow

The major muscles involved in retraction include the rhomboid major muscle, rhomboid minor muscle and trapezius muscle, whereas the major muscles involved in protraction include the serratus anterior and pectoralis minor muscles.

Sternoclavicular and acromioclavicular joints

Elbow

Wrist and fingers

Movements of the fingers

Movements of the thumb

Neck

Spine

Lower limb

Knees

Feet

The muscles tibialis anterior and tibialis posterior invert the foot. Some sources also state that the triceps surae and extensor hallucis longus invert. Inversion occurs at the subtalar joint and transverse tarsal joint.

Eversion of the foot occurs at the subtalar joint. The muscles involved in this include Fibularis longus and fibularis brevis, which are innervated by the superficial fibular nerve. Some sources also state that the fibularis tertius everts.

Dorsiflexion of the foot: The muscles involved include those of the Anterior compartment of leg, specifically  tibialis anterior muscle, extensor hallucis longus muscle, extensor digitorum longus muscle, and peroneus tertius. The range of motion for dorsiflexion indicated in the literature varies from 12.2 to 18 degrees. Foot drop is a condition, that occurs when dorsiflexion is difficult for an individual who is walking.

Plantarflexion of the foot: Primary muscles for plantar flexion are situated in the Posterior compartment of leg, namely the superficial Gastrocnemius, Soleus and Plantaris (only weak participation), and the deep muscles Flexor hallucis longus, Flexor digitorum longus and Tibialis posterior. Muscles in the Lateral compartment of leg  also weakly participate, namely the Fibularis longus and Fibularis brevis muscles. Those in the lateral compartment only have weak participation in plantar flexion though. The range of motion for plantar flexion is usually indicated in the literature as 30° to 40°, but sometimes also 50°. The nerves are primarily from the sacral spinal cord roots S1 and S2. Compression of S1 roots may result in weakness in plantarflexion; these nerves run from the lower back to the bottom of the foot. 

Pronation at the forearm is a rotational movement at the radioulnar joint, or of the foot at the subtalar and talocalcaneonavicular joints. For the forearm, when standing in the anatomical position, pronation will move the palm of the hand from an anterior-facing position to a posterior-facing position without an associated movement at the shoulder joint). This corresponds to a counterclockwise twist for the right forearm and a clockwise twist for the left (when viewed superiorly). In the forearm, this action is performed by pronator quadratus and pronator teres muscle. Brachioradialis puts the forearm into a midpronated/supinated position from either full pronation or supination. For the foot, pronation will cause the sole of the foot to face more laterally than when standing in the anatomical position.

Pronation of the foot is a compound movement that combines abduction, eversion, and dorsiflexion. Regarding posture, a pronated foot is one in which the heel bone angles inward and the arch tends to collapse.  Pronation is the motion of the inner and outer ball of the foot with the heel bone. One is said to be "knock-kneed" if one has overly pronated feet. It flattens the arch as the foot strikes the ground in order to absorb shock when the heel hits the ground, and to assist in balance during mid-stance.  If habits develop, this action can lead to foot pain as well as knee pain, shin splints, achilles tendinitis, posterior tibial tendinitis, piriformis syndrome, and plantar fasciitis..

References 

Human physiology
Movements